Sinsation is an album by PIG released in Japan in 1995. It was later released in the United States on Nothing Records on 17 September 1996. A music video for the song 'Painiac (Nothing Touches Me)' was filmed and scarcely aired on MTV in 1996; making its final broadcast in 2000 on MTV2's A-Z video marathon.

Track listing
"Serial Killer Thriller" – 6:16
"Hamstrung on the Highway" – 5:34
"Golgotha" – 1:40
"The Sick" – 5:06
"Painiac (Nothing Touches Me)" – 6:07
"Shell" – 3:26
"Analgesia" – 5:26
"Volcano" – 5:09
"Hot Hole" – 4:52
"Transceration" – 2:52

All tracks written by Raymond Watts, except track 6 written by Raymond Watts and Karl Hyde.

Personnel
Raymond Watts
Steve White – guitar
Hisashi Imai – guitar (7)
Karl Hyde – guitar (6)
Carol Anne Reynolds – backing vocals (4)
Anna Wildsmith – additional words

References

Pig (musical project) albums
1995 albums
JVC Records albums
Nothing Records albums